The Mount Tammany Fire Road is an unpaved  road on the eastern ridgeline of Kittatinny Mountain from Upper Yards Creek Reservoir to Mount Tammany, the  prominence on the New Jersey side of the Delaware Water Gap. The  fire road, located within Worthington State Forest, is maintained as a firebreak and access road for wildfire suppression efforts by the New Jersey Forest Fire Service. There are three helispots along the fire road used by the Forest Fire Service.

Today, the road is often used as part of a loop with the Appalachian Trail, Sunfish Pond Fire Road, Dunnfield Creek trail and other trails by hikers visiting the Delaware Water Gap. The Mount Tammany Fire Road connects with the Blue Dot Trail, Red Dot Trail, Turquoise and Taylor Trails on Mount Tammany.

Locations

 southern terminus:  (Mount Tammany)
 Helispot 1: 
 Helispot 2: 
 Helispot 3: 
 northern terminus:  (Upper Yards Creek Reservoir)

References

External links
 New Jersey Forest Fire Service
 Worthington State Forest
 New Jersey Division of Parks and Forestry

New Jersey Forest Fire Service
Wildfire prevention
Wildfire suppression facilities